Jean Marie Rikhoff (May 28, 1926 – June 19, 2018) was an American author and editor. She is best known for writing two trilogies: the Timble Trilogy, made up of Dear Ones All, Voyage In, Voyage Out, and Rites of Passage, and the trilogy of the North Country, consisting of Buttes Landing, One of the Raymonds, and The Sweetwater.

Rikhoff received a National Endowment for the Humanities fellowship, a Eugene Saxton fellowship in creative writing (1958), and two State University of New York creative writing fellowships. Two of her books were selected as book of the month alternates and her autobiography was selected Best Memoir of 2011 by the Adirondack Center for Writing.

Life and work
Jean Rikhoff was born in Chicago, Illinois, and grew up in Indianapolis, Indiana. She received her B.A. in English from Mount Holyoke College in 1948 and completed graduate work in English and philosophy at Wesleyan University. Her dissertation was on The Classical Imagery in Christopher Marlowe's Plays.
 
Rikhoff then left for Europe where she traveled with her first husband and taught for seven years. During this time she wrote her first novel, Dear Ones All, in Seville. Back in the US, she settled with her young daughter in the Adirondack Mountains, first living in Bolton Landing.

In 1954 she established Quixote, a literary magazine, which she also edited. Rikhoff described the magazine as a financial failure, yet continued to publish until 1966. In Quixote she wrote an annual report called "Troubles of a Small Magazine". The collected reports were published by Grosset & Dunlap as the Quixote Anthology, along with selected works from the magazine.

In the meantime, she had started to work with literary agent Barthold Fles, who was of great support to her creative writing. Rikhoff remarried and spent 20 years on a horse farm in West Hebron, where she wrote some of her best known books. In 1983 she co-founded the Loft Press in Glens Falls, for which she served as publisher and editor of the Glens Falls Review. She also worked as an editorial assistant for Gourmet Magazine.

Rikhoff took up teaching again, now at the State University of New York's Adirondack Community College. Among others, she served as faculty advisor to Expressions, the literary magazine of the Adirondack students. At the time of her retirement she was the chair of the English Department at Adirondack College. For her teaching and  academic leadership, she won the Adirondack Community College President's Award for Academic Excellence (1990) and State University of New York Chancellor's Award for Excellence in Teaching (1992).

Rikhoff died on June 19, 2018.

Bibliography

Books written
 1961 - Dear Ones All
 1961 - [http://lccn.loc.gov/61009811 Writing About the Frontier:] Mark Twain
 1963 - Voyage In, Voyage Out
 1966 - Rites of Passage
 1968 - Robert E. Lee, Soldier of the South
 1973 - Buttes Landing (Book of the Month alternate)
 1974 - One of the Raymonds (Book of the Month alternate)
 1976 - The Sweetwater
 1979 - Where Were You in '76?
 1984 - David Smith, I Remember
 2011 - Earth, Air, Fire, and Water: A Memoir (won Best Memoir 2011 by Adirondack Center for Writing)

Books edited
 1961 - Quixote Anthology
 1986 - North Country Anthology (co-editor)

References

2018 deaths
SUNY Adirondack faculty
American children's writers
American magazine editors
Writers from New York (state)
Mount Holyoke College alumni
People from Glens Falls, New York
Writers from Indianapolis
People from Bolton Landing, New York

Wesleyan University alumni
Writers from Chicago
People from Hebron, New York
American women children's writers
Journalists from New York (state)
1926 births
American women non-fiction writers
Women magazine editors
21st-century American women